The 2008 Summer Olympics Football Final was a football match that took place at the National Stadium in Beijing, China on 23 August 2008 to determine the winner of the men's football tournament at the 2008 Summer Olympics. It was the 22nd final of the men's football tournament at the Summer Olympics, a quadrennial tournament contested for the men's under-23 national teams of FIFA to decide the Olympic champions.

In front of a crowd of 89,102, Argentina won their second consecutive Olympic gold medal in football, beating Nigeria, 1–0.

Details

References

External links
Argentina vs Nigeria - Beijing 2008 Men's Football Final | Throwback Thursday

Football at the 2008 Summer Olympics – Men's tournament